The Victoria Bridge is a bridge over the Yarra River between Richmond and Hawthorn, Melbourne, Australia.  It carries Victoria Street across the Yarra.

The bridge is riveted and welded steel Warren truss bridge. It was completed in 1884.  The bridge was widened in 1890 by the addition of a third line of truss on new piers on the upstream side to carry horse trams.  In 1915 the bridge was further strengthened to accommodate the extra weight of electric trams and widened to accommodate two cantilever footpaths. Further widening and reconditioning of the bridge took place in 1933, including the addition of four new welded trusses.
 
The bridge is listed on the Victorian Heritage Register. The bridge initiated travel and trade between the industrial inner suburbs and the eastern suburbs of Melbourne and stands testimony to the development of the tramway in the city. It comprises two Ornamental Tramway Overhead Gantries which were installed in 1916. They hold an aesthetic significance because of their early 20th century ornamental design which is hard to find these days.

References

Bridges in Melbourne
Bridges over the Yarra River
Heritage-listed buildings in Melbourne
1884 establishments in Australia
Buildings and structures in the City of Boroondara
Transport in the City of Yarra
Buildings and structures in the City of Yarra
Transport in the City of Boroondara
Buildings and structures completed in 1884